Ernst Mosch (7 November 1925 – 15 May 1999) was a German musician,  composer and conductor. He was the conductor of his own Original Egerländer Musikanten. Mosch died on 15 May 1999 at the age of 73.

Compositions
 Der Falkenauer (march)
 Ein Lied aus der Heimat (waltz)
 Dompfaff (polka)
 Egerländer Musikantenmarsch
 Saazer Hopfen (polka)
 Bis bald auf Wiederseh'n (polka)
 Wir sind Kinder von der Eger (polka)
 Sterne der Heimat (polka)
 Du, nur Du (polka)
 Mondschein an der Eger (waltz)
 Böhmischer Wind (waltz)
 Die Musik, die geht uns ins Blut (polka)

External links
www.mosch-musikverlag.eu

1925 births
1999 deaths
Sudeten German people
German folk music
Naturalized citizens of Germany
People from Sokolov District